Vasyl Volodymyrovych Vovkun was Minister for Culture and Tourism of Ukraine in the second Tymoshenko Government.

Biography
Vovkun graduated from the theatre arts studio at the Zankovetska Lviv State Academical Drama Theatre and the Karpenko-Kary Kyiv State Institute of Theatrical Arts. From 1981 he performed on stage of the Chernivtsi Theatre of Music and Drama and from 1989 until 1994 he was an actor at Kyiv studio-theatre "Budmo!". In 1994 he became production director of the Ukrainian State Centre of the Cultural Initiatives. He is also the Artistic Director of the Production Workshop "Artistic Agency Art Veles" from 1995 and from 2003 the General Producer of the Kyiv Festival (until 2004 – Britten Kyiv Festival).

References

1957 births
People from Lviv Oblast
Living people
Ukrainian male stage actors
Culture and tourism ministers of Ukraine
Recipients of the Order of Merit (Ukraine), 3rd class